Yeoseo-do is an island located off the coast of Jeollanam-do, South Korea. Its residents work as both farmers and fishermen, and its main agricultural products include sweet potato, wheat, rice, bean, and sesame.

References
 Naver 백과사전: 여서도

See also
Islands of South Korea
Jeollanam-do

Islands of South Jeolla Province
Wando County